Yeol Man-hwa or Lie Wanhua (?–976, r. 938–976) was the first king of Jeongan (Ding'an), a successor state to the kingdom of Balhae (Bohai), centered near the Yalu River.

Biography
Yeol Man-hwa served a general of Later Balhae (Later Bohai), after the fall of Balhae to the Liao dynasty. In 938, Yeol overthrew the ruling Dae clan and proclaimed himself as the king of the state of Jeongan, with the aid of Oh Je-hyeon (오제현; 烏濟顯) and the Oh clan. In 970, King Yeol Man-hwa sent tribute to the Song dynasty during the reign of Emperor Taizu. However, in 976, Yeol Man-hwa himself was overthrown by the Oh clan, by Oh Je-hyeon's descendant, Oh Hyeon-myeong (Wu Xuanming).

External links

Balhae
Balhae people
Founding monarchs